Mucuchí (Mokochi) is a suspected Timotean language of Venezuela. Mirripú (Maripú) was a dialect. Most classifications place them as dialects of Timote, with Cuica being a separate language, but the data in Loukotka indicates that Timote and Cuica were one language, and Mucuchí–Marripú another; this is reflected in Campbell (2012).

References

Adelaar, Willem & Pieter Muysken (2004). The Languages of the Andes. Cambridge University Press. pp. 124–129

Indigenous languages of South America
Extinct languages of South America
Languages of Venezuela